Allocapnia granulata is a species of insect in the genus Allocapnia.

References

Plecoptera